Ashley Lane (born 1 October 1990) is an English professional boxer. He held the Commonwealth super-bantamweight title from 2017 to 2019 and challenged for the British super-bantamweight title in 2019.

Professional career
Lane made his professional debut on 1 April 2011, fighting to a second-round technical draw in a four-round bout against Ryan McNicol at the Park Inn Hotel in Northampton. The contest was stopped after Lane suffered a cut due to an accidental clash of heads. Lane defeated McNicol in an immediate rematch at the same venue in the following July, winning by points decision (PTS) over four-rounds. In his next fight he suffered the first defeat of his career, losing by third-round technical knockout (TKO) against Jonathan Fry in October, before fighting to a draw against future world title challenger, Gavin McDonnell, in March 2012.

After two more wins and another loss, he faced future British bantamweight champion, Josh Wale, for the vacant British Masters super-bantamweight title on 29 March 2013 at the Barnsley Metrodome. After being knocked down twice in the ninth, Lane quit on his stool at the end of the round to suffer the third defeat of his career, losing via ninth-round corner retirement (RTD).

After three more fights – two wins and a stoppage loss to future world champion Kal Yafai – Lane stepped in as a late replacement to face Dai Davies after his original opponent, Kris Jones, pulled out due to suffering from the flu. The bout took place on 24 October 2014 at the Rhydycar Leisure Centre in Merthyr Tydfil, Wales, with the vacant International Masters featherweight title on the line. Lane suffered his fifth professional defeat, losing via PTS over ten rounds.

In his next fight he suffered his second consecutive defeat and the sixth of his career, losing by seventh-round TKO to Ryan Farrag for the vacant English bantamweight title on 13 December 2014 at the Hillsborough Leisure Centre in Sheffield. He came back from defeat to capture the vacant Midlands Area bantamweight title by defeating Brett Fidoe via PTS on 27 March 2015 at the City Academy Sports Centre in Bristol, before failing in his second attempt for the vacant English title, losing to Jason Cunningham via ten-round unanimous decision (UD) on 27 February 2016 at the Doncaster Dome.

Six fights later – with four wins and one loss – he fought Michael Ramabeletsa on 23 September 2017 in a rematch of their 2012 bout, in which Ramabeletsa won, for the vacant Commonwealth super-bantamweight title. Lane got his revenge over Ramabeletsa, winning by UD to capture the Commonwealth title at the PlayFootball Arena in Swindon. The judges scorecards reading 117–112, 116–112 and 116–113. After two PTS wins in non-title fights, he faced British super-bantamweight champion, Brad Foster, on 18 May 2019 at the Lamex Stadium in Stevenage. After being knocked down once in the first round and again in the twelfth, Lane lost by TKO after the referee called a halt to the contest with just two seconds remaining of the final round.

Professional boxing record

References

Living people
1990 births
English male boxers
Sportspeople from Northampton
Bantamweight boxers
Super-bantamweight boxers
Featherweight boxers
Commonwealth Boxing Council champions